James Gordon Brown  (born 20 February 1951) is a British politician who served as Prime Minister of the United Kingdom and Leader of the Labour Party from 2007 to 2010. He previously served as Chancellor of the Exchequer in Tony Blair's government from 1997 to 2007, and was a Member of Parliament (MP) from 1983 to 2015, first for Dunfermline East and later for Kirkcaldy and Cowdenbeath. Brown is the most recent Labour politician as well as the most recent Scottish politician to hold the office of prime minister.

A doctoral graduate, Brown studied history at the University of Edinburgh, where he was elected Rector in 1972. He spent his early career working as both a lecturer at a further education college and a television journalist. Brown was elected to the House of Commons in 1983 as the MP for Dunfermline East, later becoming the MP for Kirkcaldy and Cowdenbeath in 2005. He joined the Shadow Cabinet in 1989 as Shadow Secretary of State for Trade, and was later promoted to become Shadow Chancellor of the Exchequer in 1992. Following Labour's victory in the 1997 general election, its largest landslide general election victory in history, Brown was appointed as Chancellor of the Exchequer, becoming the longest-serving holder of that office in modern history.

Brown's time as chancellor was marked by major reform of Britain's monetary and fiscal policy architecture, transferring interest rate setting powers to the Bank of England, by a wide extension of the powers of the Treasury to cover much domestic policy and by transferring responsibility for banking supervision to the Financial Services Authority. Brown presided over the longest period of sustained economic growth in British history. He outlined five economic tests, which resisted the UK adopting the euro currency. Controversial moves included the abolition of advance corporation tax (ACT) relief in his first budget, the sale of UK gold reserves from 1999 to 2002, and the removal in his final budget of the 10% starting rate of personal income tax which he had introduced in 1999.

Following Blair's resignation in 2007, Brown was elected unopposed to replace him, becoming Labour leader on 24 June and being appointed prime minister three days later on 27 June. Under Brown, the party continued to use the campaign label New Labour, though Brown's style of government differed to that of Blair. Brown's government introduced rescue packages in 2008 and 2009 to help keep the banks afloat during the global financial crisis, and as a result the national debt increased dramatically. The government took majority shareholdings in Northern Rock and Royal Bank of Scotland, both of which experienced severe financial difficulties, and injected large amounts of public money into several other banks, including Lloyds Banking Group, which formed through the acquisition of HBOS by Lloyds TSB in 2009. In 2008, Brown's government passed the world's first Climate Change Act, and introduced the Equality Act 2010.

Despite initial rises in opinion polls after Brown became prime minister, Labour's popularity declined with the onset of the Great Recession, leading to poor results in the local and European elections in 2009. In the 2010 general election, Labour lost 91 seats, the party's biggest loss of seats in a single general election since 1931, resulting in a hung parliament in which the Conservative Party won the most seats. Brown remained prime minister while the Liberal Democrats entered separate negotiations with Labour and the Conservatives with a view to forming a coalition government. After the Conservatives formed a coalition government with the Liberal Democrats, Brown was succeeded as prime minister by Conservative leader David Cameron, and as Labour Party leader by Ed Miliband.

After leaving office, Brown returned to the backbenches, continuing to serve as the MP for Kirkcaldy and Cowdenbeath until he gave up his seat in 2015, has since made occasional political interventions, and has also published several political themed books. Brown played a prominent role in the campaign to maintain the union between Scotland and the United Kingdom during the 2014 Scottish independence referendum, and in 2022 unveiled a Labour Party blueprint with incumbent Labour leader Keir Starmer for the future, proposing the biggest ever transfer of political power out of Westminster and into the towns, cities, and nations of the UK. Since stepping down as an MP, Brown has served as the United Nations Special Envoy for Global Education and the WHO Ambassador for Global Health Financing.

As chancellor, Brown had high approval ratings and was rated as the most successful chancellor in terms of providing economic stability, working independently from the prime minister and leaving a lasting legacy on Britain's economy. During the first four months of his premiership, Brown enjoyed a substantial lead in the polls, but his popularity fell significantly throughout the remainder of his tenure. His premiership has generally been viewed as average in historical rankings and public opinion of British prime ministers.

Early life
James Gordon Brown was born at the Orchard Maternity Nursing Home in Giffnock, Renfrewshire, Scotland. His father was John Ebenezer Brown (1914–1998), a minister of the Church of Scotland and a strong influence on Brown. His mother was Jessie Elizabeth "Bunty" Brown (née Souter; 1918–2004); she was the daughter of John Souter, a timber merchant. The family moved to Kirkcaldy – then the largest town in Fife, across the Firth of Forth from Edinburgh – when Gordon was three. Brown was brought up there with his elder brother John and younger brother Andrew in a manse; he is therefore often referred to as a "son of the manse", an idiomatic Scottish phrase, similar to the American phrase "preacher's kid".

Education
Brown was educated first at Kirkcaldy West Primary School where he was selected for an experimental fast stream education programme, which took him two years early to Kirkcaldy High School for an academic hothouse education taught in separate classes. Aged 16, he wrote that he loathed and resented this "ludicrous" experiment on young lives.

He was accepted by the University of Edinburgh to study history at the same early age of 16. During an end-of-term rugby union match at his old school, he received a kick to the head and experienced a retinal detachment. This left him blind in his left eye, despite treatment including several operations and weeks spent lying in a darkened room. Later at Edinburgh, while playing tennis, he noticed the same symptoms in his right eye. Brown underwent experimental surgery at the Edinburgh Royal Infirmary and his right eye was saved by a young eye surgeon, Hector Chawla. Brown graduated from Edinburgh with an undergraduate MA degree with First-Class Honours in history in 1972. He stayed on to obtain his PhD degree in history, which he gained ten years later in 1982, defending a thesis titled The Labour Party and Political Change in Scotland 1918–1929.

In his youth at the University of Edinburgh, Brown was involved in a romantic relationship with Margarita, Crown Princess of Romania. Margarita said about it: "It was a very solid and romantic story. I never stopped loving him but one day it didn't seem right anymore, it was politics, politics, politics, and I needed nurturing." An unnamed friend of those years is quoted by Paul Routledge in his biography of Brown as recalling: "She was sweet and gentle and obviously cut out to make somebody a very good wife. She was bright, too, though not like him, but they seemed made for each other."

In 1972, while still a student, Brown was elected Rector of the University of Edinburgh, the convener of the University Court. He served as Rector until 1975, and also edited the document The Red Paper on Scotland.

Career before Parliament
From 1976 to 1980 Brown was employed as a lecturer in politics at Glasgow College of Technology. He also worked as a tutor for the Open University. In the 1979 general election, Brown stood for the Edinburgh South constituency, losing to the Conservative candidate, Michael Ancram.

From 1980, he worked as a journalist at Scottish Television, later serving as current affairs editor until his election to Parliament in 1983.

Election to Parliament and opposition
Brown was elected to Parliament as a Labour MP at his second attempt, for Dunfermline East in the 1983 general election. His first Westminster office mate was a newly elected MP from the Sedgefield constituency, Tony Blair. Brown became an opposition spokesman on Trade and Industry in 1985. In 1986, he published a biography of the Independent Labour Party politician James Maxton, the subject of his doctoral thesis. Brown was Shadow Chief Secretary to the Treasury from 1987 to 1989 and then Shadow Secretary of State for Trade and Industry, before becoming Shadow Chancellor in 1992 after Labour's fourth consecutive defeat in the general election that year. Having led the Labour Movement Yes campaign, refusing to join the cross-party Yes for Scotland campaign, during the 1979 Scottish devolution referendum, while other senior Labour politicians – including Robin Cook, Tam Dalyell and Brian Wilson – campaigned for a No vote, Brown was subsequently a key participant in the Scottish Constitutional Convention, signing the Claim of Right for Scotland in 1989.

Labour leader John Smith died suddenly in May 1994. Brown did not contest the leadership after Tony Blair became the favourite, deciding to make way for Blair to avoid splitting the pro-modernising vote in the leadership ballot.

It has long been rumoured a deal was struck between Blair and Brown at the former Granita restaurant in Islington, in which Blair promised to give Brown control of economic policy in return for Brown not standing against him in the leadership election. Whether this is true or not, the relationship between Blair and Brown was central to the fortunes of New Labour, and they mostly remained united in public, despite reported serious private rifts.

As Shadow Chancellor, Brown as Chancellor-in-waiting was seen as a good choice by business and the middle class. During his tenure as Chancellor, the rate of inflation sometimes exceeded the 2% target; the Governor of the Bank of England, under the rules governing the Bank's role, wrote an explanatory letter to the Chancellor on each occasion inflation exceeded three per cent. Following a reorganisation of Westminster constituencies in Scotland in 2005, Brown became MP for Kirkcaldy and Cowdenbeath at the general election.

Chancellor of the Exchequer (1997–2007)

In the 1997 general election, Labour defeated the Conservatives by a landslide to end their 18-year exile from government, and when Tony Blair, the new Prime Minister, announced his ministerial team on 2 May 1997, he appointed Brown as Chancellor of the Exchequer. Brown would remain in this role for 10 years and two months, making him the longest-serving Chancellor in modern history. Some achievements from Brown's decade as chancellor included making the Bank of England independent and delivering an agreement on poverty and climate change at the G8 summit in 2005.

Early economic reforms
On taking office as Chancellor of the Exchequer Brown gave the Bank of England operational independence in monetary policy, and thus responsibility for setting interest rates through the Bank's Monetary Policy Committee. At the same time, he also changed the inflation measure from the Retail Price Index to the Consumer Price Index and transferred responsibility for banking supervision to the Financial Services Authority. Some commentators have argued that this division of responsibilities exacerbated the severity in Britain of the 2007 global banking crisis.

Taxation and spending
During the 1997 election campaign and subsequently, Brown pledged not to increase the basic or higher rates of income tax. Over his Chancellorship he reduced the basic rate from 23% to 20%; however, in all budgets but his final one, he increased the tax thresholds in line with inflation rather than with earnings, resulting in fiscal drag. Under Brown, corporation tax fell from a main rate of 33% to 28%, and from 24% to 19% for small businesses. In 1999, he introduced a lower tax band of 10%. He abolished this 10% tax band in his last budget in 2007 to reduce the basic rate from 22% to 20%, increasing tax for 5 million people and, according to the calculations of the Institute for Fiscal Studies, leaving those earning between £5,000 and £18,000 as the biggest losers. To backbench cheers, Brown had described the measure in his last Budget thus: "Having put in place more focused ways of incentivising work and directly supporting children and pensioners at a cost of £3bn a year, I can now return income tax to just two rates by removing the 10p band on non-savings income". Brown also implemented the Windfall Tax in 1997 on the privatised utilities. The tax produced an estimated one off income to the government of £5 billion which was used to fund the New Deal, a welfare-to-work program that sought to tackle long-term unemployment.

According to the OECD UK taxation increased from a 39.3% share of gross domestic product in 1997 to 42.4% in 2006, going to a higher level than that of Germany. This increase has mainly been attributed to active government policy, and not simply to the growing economy. Conservatives have accused Brown of imposing "stealth taxes". A commonly reported example resulted in 1997 from a technical change in the way corporation tax is collected, the indirect effect of which was for the dividends on stock investments held within pensions to be taxed, thus lowering pension returns and contributing to the demise of most of the final salary pension funds in the UK. The Treasury contends that this tax change was crucial to long-term economic growth.

Brown's 2000 Spending Review outlined a major expansion of government spending, particularly on health and education. In his April 2002 budget, Brown increased National Insurance to pay for health spending. He also introduced working tax credits, and in his last budget as Chancellor, Brown gave an extra £3 billion in pension allowances, an increase in the child tax credit, and an increase in the working tax credit. These increases were followed by another £1 billion of support for increases in the child tax credit.

Under Brown, the tax code, the standard guide to tax, doubled in length to 17,000 pages.

European single currency
In October 1997, Brown announced that the Treasury would set five economic tests to determine whether the economic case had been made for the United Kingdom to adopt the European single currency. The Treasury indicated that the tests had not been passed in June 2003.

Other issues
In 2000, Brown was accused of starting a political row about higher education (referred to as the Laura Spence affair) when he accused the University of Oxford of elitism in its admissions procedures, describing its decision not to offer a place to state school pupil Laura Spence as "absolutely outrageous". Lord Jenkins, then Oxford Chancellor and himself a former Labour Chancellor of the Exchequer, said "nearly every fact he used was false."

Between 1999 and 2002 Brown sold 60% of the UK's gold reserves shortly before gold entered a protracted bull market, since nicknamed by dealers as the Brown Bottom or Brown's Bottom. The official reason for selling the gold reserves was to reduce the portfolio risk of the UK's reserves by diversifying away from gold. The UK eventually sold about 395 tons of gold over 17 auctions from July 1999 to March 2002, at an average price of about US$275 per ounce, raising approximately US$3.5 billion. By 2011, that quantity of gold would be worth over $19 billion, leading to Brown's decision to sell the gold being widely criticised.

As Chancellor, Brown argued against renationalising the railways, saying at the Labour conference in 2004 that it would cost £22 billion.

During his time as Chancellor, Brown reportedly believed that it was appropriate to remove most, but not all, of the unpayable Third World debt. On 20 April 2006, in a speech to the United Nations Ambassadors, Brown outlined a "Green" view of global development.

Run-up to succeeding Tony Blair

In October 2004, Tony Blair announced he would not lead the party into a fourth general election, but would serve a full third term. Political comment over the relationship between Brown and Blair continued up to and beyond the 2005 election, which Labour won with a reduced majority and reduced vote share. Blair announced on 7 September 2006 that he would step down within a year. Brown was the clear favourite to succeed Blair; he was the only candidate spoken of seriously in Westminster. Appearances and news coverage leading up to the handover were interpreted as preparing the ground for Brown to become Prime Minister, in part by creating the impression of a statesman with a vision for leadership and global change. This enabled Brown to signal the most significant priorities for his agenda as Prime Minister; speaking at a Fabian Society conference on 'The Next Decade' in January 2007, he stressed education, international development, narrowing inequalities (to pursue 'equality of opportunity and fairness of outcome'), renewing Britishness, restoring trust in politics, and winning hearts and minds in the war on terror as key priorities.

Prime Minister (2007–2010)

Brown became the Prime Minister of the United Kingdom on 27 June 2007. He was succeeded by Alistair Darling as Chancellor the following day. Like all modern Prime Ministers, Brown concurrently served as the First Lord of the Treasury and the Minister for the Civil Service, and was a member of the Cabinet of the United Kingdom. Until his resignation from the post in May 2010, he was Leader of the Labour Party. He was Member of Parliament for the constituency of Kirkcaldy and Cowdenbeath until he stepped down in 2015. He was the sixth post-war Prime Minister, of a total of 13, to assume the role without having won a general election. Brown was the first Prime Minister from a Scottish constituency since the Conservative Sir Alec Douglas-Home in 1964. Not all British prime ministers have been university graduates, but, of those that were, Brown was one of only five that had not attended either Oxford or Cambridge. He proposed moving some traditional prime ministerial powers conferred by royal prerogative to the realm of Parliament, such as the power to declare war and approve appointments to senior positions. Brown wanted Parliament to gain the right to ratify treaties and have more oversight into the intelligence services. He also proposed moving some powers from Parliament to citizens, including the right to form "citizens' juries", easily petition Parliament for new laws, and rally outside Westminster. He asserted that the attorney general should not have the right to decide whether to prosecute in individual cases, such as in the loans for peerages scandal.

There was speculation during September and early October 2007 about whether Brown would call a snap general election. Indeed, the party launched the Not flash, just Gordon advertising campaign, which was seen largely as pre-election promotion of Brown as Prime Minister; however, Brown announced on 6 October that there would be no election any time soon – despite opinion polls showing that he was capable of winning an election should he call one. This proved to be a costly mistake, as during 2008 his party slid behind the Conservatives (led by David Cameron) in the polls. Disputes over political donations, a string of losses in local elections, and by-election losses in Crewe and Glasgow did himself and the government no favours either.

His political opponents accused him of being indecisive, which Brown denied. In July 2008, he supported a new bill extending the pre-charge detention period to 42 days. The bill was met with opposition on both sides of the House and backbench rebellion. In the end, the bill passed by just nine votes. The House of Lords defeated the bill, with Lords characterising it as "fatally flawed, ill thought through and unnecessary", stating that "it seeks to further erode fundamental legal and civil rights".

Brown was mentioned by the press in the expenses crisis for claiming for the payment of his cleaner; however, no wrongdoing was found and the Commons Authority did not pursue Brown over the claim. Meanwhile, the Commons Fees Office stated that a double payment for a £153 plumbing repair bill was a mistake on their part and that Brown had repaid it in full.

Domestic policy

During his Labour leadership campaign Brown proposed some policy initiatives, which he called the manifesto for change.

The manifesto included a clampdown on corruption and a new Ministerial Code, which set out clear standards of behaviour for ministers. He also stated in a speech when announcing his bid that he wants a "better constitution" that is "clear about the rights and responsibilities of being a citizen in Britain today". He planned to set up an all-party convention to look at new powers for Parliament and to look at rebalancing powers between Whitehall and local government. Brown said he would give Parliament the final say on whether British troops were sent into action in future.

He said he wanted to release more land and ease access to ownership with shared equity schemes. He backed a proposal to build new eco-towns, each housing between 10,000 and 20,000 homeowners – up to 100,000 new homes in total.
Brown also said he wanted to have doctors' surgeries open at the weekends, and GPs on call in the evenings. Doctors were given the right of opting out of out-of-hours care in 2007, under a controversial pay deal, signed by then-Health Secretary John Reid, which awarded them a 22 per cent pay rise in 2006. Brown also stated in the manifesto that the National Health Service (NHS) was his top priority.

On 5 June 2007, just three weeks before he was due to take the post of Prime Minister, Brown made a speech promising "British Jobs for British workers". Brown reiterated that promise at the Labour Party's annual conference in September, which caused controversy as he coupled this with a commitment to crack down on migrant workers. The Conservative Party, led by David Cameron, promptly pointed out that such a commitment was illegal under EU law. Other controversial statements made by Brown about migration included him stating that English lessons and taking mandatory community service should be prerequisites for being granted UK citizenship.

During the Queen's Speech to Parliament on 3 December 2008, the Brown government unveiled plans to introduce lie detector tests, based on voice recognition technology, in order to determine whether to accept benefit claims. Despite having spent £2.4 million on these tests, trials performed by the Department of Work and Pensions showed that they were inaccurate approximately four of every seven times they were used.

Foreign policy

Brown had been committed to the Iraq War, but said in a speech in June 2007 that he would "learn the lessons" from the mistakes made in Iraq. Brown said in a letter published on 17 March 2008 that the United Kingdom would hold an inquiry into the war.

Brown went to great lengths to empathise with those who lost family members in the Iraq and Afghanistan conflicts. He has often said "War is tragic", echoing Blair's quote, "War is horrible". Nonetheless, in November 2007 Brown was accused by some senior military figures of not adhering to the Military Covenant, a convention within British politics ensuring adequate safeguards, rewards and compensation for military personnel who risk their lives in obedience to orders derived from the policy of the elected government.

Brown did not attend the opening ceremony of the 2008 Summer Olympics on 8 August 2008 in Beijing; instead, he attended the closing ceremony on 24 August 2008. Brown had been under intense pressure from human rights campaigners to send a message to China, concerning the 2008 Tibetan unrest. His decision not to attend the opening ceremony was not an act of protest, but rather was made several weeks in advance and not intended as a stand on principle.

In a speech in July 2007, Brown clarified his position regarding Britain's relationship with the United States: "We will not allow people to separate us from the United States of America in dealing with the common challenges that we face around the world. I think people have got to remember that the special relationship between a British prime minister and an American president is built on the things that we share, the same enduring values about the importance of liberty, opportunity, the dignity of the individual. I will continue to work, as Tony Blair did, very closely with the American administration."

Brown and the Labour party had pledged to allow a referendum on the EU Treaty of Lisbon. On 13 December 2007, Foreign Secretary David Miliband attended for the Prime Minister at the official signing ceremony in Lisbon of the EU Reform Treaty. Brown's opponents on both sides of the House, and in the press, suggested that ratification by Parliament was not enough and that a referendum should also be held. Labour's 2005 manifesto had pledged to give the British public a referendum on the original EU Constitution. Brown argued that the Treaty significantly differed from the Constitution, and as such did not require a referendum. He also responded with plans for a lengthy debate on the topic, and stated that he believed the document to be too complex to be decided by referendum.

Drug policy
During Brown's premiership, in October 2008, the Advisory Council on the Misuse of Drugs (ACMD) recommended to the then Home Secretary Jacqui Smith that cannabis remain classified as a Class C drug. Acting against the advice of the council, she chose to reclassify it as Class B. After Professor David Nutt, the chair of the ACMD, criticised this move in a lecture in 2009, he was asked to step down by then Home Secretary Alan Johnson. Following his resignation, Professor Nutt said Brown had "made up his mind" to reclassify cannabis despite evidence to the contrary. Brown had argued, "I don't think that the previous studies took into account that so much of the cannabis on the streets is now of a lethal quality and we really have got to send out a message to young people—this is not acceptable". Professor Nutt's predecessor at the ACMD, Sir Michael Rawlins, later said, "Governments may well have good reasons for taking an alternative view ... When that happens, then the government should explain why it's ignoring the particular advice".

Global recession
Brown's premiership coincided with the global recession, during which Brown called for fiscal action in an attempt to stimulate aggregate demand. Domestically, Brown's administration introduced measures including a bank rescue package worth around £500 billion (approximately $850 billion), a temporary 2.5 percentage point cut in value-added tax and a "car scrappage" scheme.

Challenges to leadership
In mid-2008, Brown's leadership was presented with a challenge as some MPs openly called for him to resign.  This event was dubbed the 'Lancashire Plot', as two backbenchers from (pre-1974) Lancashire urged him to step down and a third questioned his chances of holding on to the Labour Party leadership.  Several MPs argued that if Brown did not recover in the polls by early 2009, he should call for a leadership contest; however, certain prominent MPs, such as Jacqui Smith and Bill Rammell, suggested that Brown was the right person to lead Britain through its economic crisis.  In the autumn, Siobhain McDonagh, an MP and junior government whip, who during her time in office had never voted against the government, spoke of the need for discussion over Brown's position.  While she did not state that she wanted Brown deposed, she implored the Labour Party to hold a leadership election. McDonagh was sacked from her role shortly afterward, on 12 September. She was supported in making clear her desire for a contest by Joan Ryan (who applied, as McDonagh had, for leadership nomination papers, and became the second rebel to be fired from her job), Jim Dowd, Greg Pope, and a string of others who had previously held positions in government. In the face of this speculation over Brown's future, his ministers backed him to lead the party, and Harriet Harman and David Miliband denied that they were preparing leadership bids. After Labour lost the Glasgow East by-election in July, Harman, the deputy leader of the party, said that Brown was the "solution", not the "problem"; Home Secretary Smith, Justice Secretary Jack Straw, Schools Secretary Ed Balls and Cabinet Office Minister Ed Miliband all re-affirmed their support for Brown. The Deputy Prime Minister under Blair, John Prescott, also pledged his support. Foreign Secretary David Miliband then denied that he was plotting a leadership bid, when on 30 July, an article written by him in The Guardian was interpreted by a large number in the media as an attempt to undermine Brown. In the article, Miliband outlined the party's future, but neglected to mention the Prime Minister. Miliband, responded to this by saying that he was confident Brown could lead Labour to victory in the next general election, and that his article was an attack against the fatalism in the party since the loss of Glasgow-East. Miliband continued to show his support for Brown in the face of the challenge that emerged in September, as did Business Secretary John Hutton, Environment Secretary Hilary Benn, and Chief Whip Geoff Hoon.

On 4 June 2009 James Purnell resigned from the Cabinet, and called for Brown's resignation as Prime Minister.

On 6 January 2010, Patricia Hewitt and Geoff Hoon jointly called for a secret ballot on the future of Brown's leadership.  The call received little support, and the following day Hoon said that it appeared to have failed and was "over".  Brown later referred to the call for a secret ballot as a "form of silliness".

By-elections and 2009 local and EU elections
In the local elections on 1 May 2008, Labour suffered its worst results in 40 years, finishing in third place with a projected 24% share of the national vote. Subsequently, the party saw the loss of by-elections in Crewe and Nantwich and Henley as well as slumps in the polls. A by-election in Glasgow East triggered by the resignation of David Marshall saw Labour struggle to appoint a candidate, eventually settling for Margaret Curran, a sitting MSP in the Scottish Parliament. The SNP, Conservatives and Liberal Democrats all derided Labour for their disorganised nature, with Alex Salmond commenting "This is their 'lost weekend'—they don't have a leader in Scotland, they don't have a candidate in Glasgow East, and they have a prime minister who refuses to come to the constituency". Labour lost the constituency to the Scottish National Party's John Mason who took 11,277 votes, with Labour just 365 behind. The seat experienced a swing of 22.54%.

In the European elections, Labour polled 16% of the vote, finishing in third place behind the Conservatives and UK Independence Party (UKIP). Voter apathy was reflected in the historically low turnout of around thirty-three per cent. In Scotland, voter turnout was only twenty-eight per cent. In the local elections, Labour polled 23% of the vote, finishing in third place behind Conservatives and Liberal Democrats, with Labour losing control of the four councils it had held prior to the election. In a vote widely considered to be a reaction to the expenses scandal, the share of the votes was down for all the major parties; Labour was down one percent, the Conservative share was down five percent. The beneficiary of the public backlash was generally seen to be the minor parties, including the Green Party and UKIP. These results were Labour's worst since World War II. Brown was quoted in the press as having said that the results were "a painful defeat for Labour", and that "too many good people doing so much good for their communities and their constituencies have lost through no fault of their own."

2010 general election

In April 2010, Brown asked the Queen to dissolve Parliament. The general election campaign included the first televised leadership debates in Britain. The result of the election on 6 May was a hung parliament. Brown was re-elected as MP for Kirkcaldy and Cowdenbeath with 29,559 votes.

2010 government formation and resignation

Brown announced on 10 May 2010 that he would stand down as Labour Leader, with a view to a successor being chosen before the next Labour Party Conference in September 2010. The following day, negotiations between the Labour Party and the Liberal Democrats to form a coalition government failed. During the evening, Brown visited Buckingham Palace to tender his resignation as Prime Minister to Queen Elizabeth II and to recommend that she invite the Leader of the Opposition, David Cameron, to form a government. He resigned as leader of the Labour Party with immediate effect.

Post-premiership

Return to the backbenches (2010–2015)

On 13 May 2010, in his first public appearance since leaving 10 Downing Street, two days after resigning as Prime Minister and Leader of the Labour Party, Brown confirmed he intended to stay on in Parliament, serving as a Labour backbencher, to serve the people of his Kirkcaldy and Cowdenbeath constituency. He continued to serve as the MP of Kirkcaldy and Cowdenbeath until 2015.

Towards the end of May 2010, Brown began writing Beyond the Crash, completing it after 14 weeks. The book discusses the 2007–08 financial crisis and Brown's recommendations for future co-ordinated global action.

He played a prominent role in the lead-up to, and the aftermath of, the 2014 Scottish independence referendum, campaigning for Scotland to stay in the United Kingdom. "Our vision for the future of Scotland – yes a Scottish parliament for fairness, battling for equality across the UK", he told voters in an impassioned speech on the eve of polling. "But our vision is bigger than that – at every point, particularly through our membership of the UK, to fight for what is our dream, what is our demand. A world not of a separate state, but a world of social justice people can believe in. What kind of message does Scotland send to the world if, tomorrow, we said we are going to give up on sharing, we are going to smash our partnership, we are going to abandon co-operation and we are going to throw the idea of solidarity into the dust. This is not the Scotland I know and recognise."

On 1 December 2014, Brown announced that he would not be seeking re-election to parliament. He stood down at the general election in May 2015.

IMF speculation
In April 2011, media reports linked Brown with the role of managing director of the International Monetary Fund following the scheduled retirement of Dominique Strauss-Kahn. Brown's successor and Leader of the Opposition, Ed Miliband, supported Brown for the role, while the Prime Minister, David Cameron, voiced opposition to this. Following the arrest of Strauss-Kahn for alleged sexual assault in May 2011, and his subsequent resignation, these reports re-surfaced. Support for Brown among economists was mixed but British Government backing for his candidature was not forthcoming and instead supported Christine Lagarde – the eventual successful candidate – for the post.

Other appointments

Sir Tim Berners-Lee, who had worked with the government during Brown's premiership to publish government data on the internet in the data.gov.uk project, subsequently invited Brown to become a board director of the World Wide Web Foundation to "advise the Web Foundation on ways to involve disadvantaged communities and global leaders in the development of sustainable programs that connect humanity and affect positive change". On 22 April 2011 it was announced that Brown would be taking on an unpaid advisory role at the World Economic Forum. Brown was also appointed as the inaugural 'Distinguished Leader in Residence' by New York University and took part in discussions and lectures relating to the global financial crisis and globalisation.

In July 2012 Brown was named by Secretary-General Ban Ki-moon as a United Nations Special Envoy on Global Education. He chaired the International Commission on Financing Global Education Opportunity. The position is unpaid.

In December 2015, Brown took his first large-scale role in the private sector since standing down as prime minister in 2010, becoming an advisor to PIMCO. Any money earned from the role is to go to the Gordon and Sarah Brown Foundation to support charitable work.

On 7 November 2017, Brown released his memoir My Life, Our Times.

In September 2020, Brown was a co-author of a letter to the journal Nature highlighting the importance of EU funding in the fight against COVID-19. The letter was organised by Scientists for Labour, an organisation of which he is a patron.

On 10 June 2021 Brown released the book Seven Ways to Change the World: How To Fix The Most Pressing Problems We Face. The book features Brown’s forensic examination of seven areas where global reform and action are essential.

As a former Prime Minister, Brown, with Sarah, had a place of honour at the state funeral of Queen Elizabeth II on 19 September 2022.

On 5 December 2022, Brown and Labour leader Keir Starmer unveiled a Labour Party blueprint for the future, proposing the biggest ever transfer of political power out of Westminster and into the towns, cities, and nations of the UK.

Personal life

Brown's early girlfriends included journalist Sheena McDonald and Princess Margarita, the eldest daughter of exiled King Michael of Romania. At the age of 49, Brown married Sarah Macaulay in a private ceremony at his home in North Queensferry, Fife, on 3 August 2000. A daughter, Jennifer Jane, was born prematurely on 28 December 2001; she died on 7 January 2002, one day after experiencing a brain haemorrhage. The couple have two sons, John Macaulay (born 17 October 2003) and (James) Fraser (born on 18 July 2006). In November 2006, Fraser was diagnosed with cystic fibrosis. The Sun had learned of the situation in 2006 and published the story. In 2011, Brown stated he had wanted the details of his son's condition kept private and that the publication had left him "in tears". The Sun said they approached Brown and that discussion occurred with his colleagues who provided quotes to use in the article.

Sarah Brown rarely made official appearances, whether with or without her husband. She is patron of several charities and has written articles for national newspapers related to this. At the 2008 Labour Party Conference, Sarah caused surprise by taking to the stage to introduce her husband for his keynote address. Since then her public profile has increased.

Brown has two brothers, John Brown and Andrew Brown. Andrew has been Head of Media Relations in the UK for the French-owned utility company EDF Energy since 2004. Brown is also the brother-in-law of environmental journalist Clare Rewcastle Brown; he wrote a piece for The Independent supporting Clare's current environmental efforts on behalf of Sarawak.

While Prime Minister, Brown spent some of his spare time at Chequers, the house often being filled with friends. The Browns have entertained local dignitaries like Sir Leonard Figg. Brown is also a friend of Harry Potter author J. K. Rowling, who says of Brown: "I know him as affable, funny and gregarious, a great listener, a kind and loyal friend."

Brown is a strong supporter of the NHS, owing partly to both the experimental surgery that saved the sight in his right eye after his retina became detached, and the care he and Sarah Brown received when their premature firstborn baby died. It has been suggested that visual difficulties have contributed to Brown's supposed antisocial nature and awkward public manner. For example, both on a podium and before a camera, while reading "he needs to look slightly to one side of the paper to focus; when speaking to an audience or into a camera lens, he must remember to correct what would normally be an automatic tendency to look slightly askew to see clearly with his good eye". Brown's papers were prepared in capital letters and in extremely large type, resulting in his stack of papers at the dispatch box being noticeably bulky. Former staffers often attributed Brown's outbursts of temper in Downing Street to his frustration with his visual limitations. Nevertheless, it is noted that he has never allowed these limitations to hold him back and in fact attributed them to the shaping of his political character.

Brown is a supporter of Kirkcaldy-based football club Raith Rovers and has written articles about his relationship with the club.

Religion
A son of a Church of Scotland minister, Brown has talked about what he calls his "moral compass" and of his parents being his "inspiration". He has, at least ostensibly, been keen to keep his religion a private matter. According to The Guardian, he is a member of the Church of Scotland.

Depictions 
The Deal, a 2003 television film, followed Tony Blair's rise to power, and his friendship and rivalry with Brown, played by David Morrissey. In The Trial of Tony Blair (2007) Brown was played by Peter Mullan, and in the Channel 4 television film Coalition (2015) he was portrayed by Ian Grieve.

Honours
  Doctor of the University (D.Univ.) from Brunel University (1996)
 Doctor Honoris Causa (Hon.Dr.) from University of Edinburgh (2003)
 Honorary Doctor of Laws (LL.D.) from Robert Gordon University (2003)
 Honorary Doctor of Humane Letters (D.H.L.) from New York University (2005)
 Honorary Doctor of Civil Law (D.C.L.) from Newcastle University (2007)
 Honorary Doctor of Letters (D.Litt.) from University of Delhi (2008)
 Doctor of the University (D.Univ.) from University of Glasgow (2015)
 Elected an Honorary Fellow of the Royal Society of Edinburgh (HonFRSE; 2018)

In March 2009, Brown was named World Statesman of the Year by the Appeal of Conscience Foundation, an American organisation 'dedicated to promoting peace, human rights and understanding between religious faiths'. The award was presented by Rabbi Arthur Schneier who praised Brown's "compassionate leadership in dealing with the challenging issues facing humanity, his commitment to freedom, human dignity and the environment, and for the major role he has played in helping to stabilise the world's financial system".

Brown has, on six occasions, been honoured in the Scottish Politician of the Year awards organised by The Herald newspaper. In 1999, 2000, 2007 and 2014, he won the award in the Best Scot at Westminster category. He won the Lifetime Achievement Award/Outstanding Political Achievement category in 2011. And in 2020, he was designated "best of the best" in the Best Scot at Westminster category.

Publications

Keir Hardie: Labour's first leader. BBC Radio Scotland programme. September 2015.

See also

 Brownism
 List of TED speakers

References

Further reading

Biographies

External links

 Gordon Brown Official government profile
 Official website of the Office of Gordon and Sarah Brown
 
 Gordon Brown at Encyclopædia Britannica
 Tour diary: Gordon Brown in Africa BBC News, January 2005 trip about his 'Marshall plan for Africa'
 
 
 
 
 
 
 
 
Speeches
 Transcript of Gordon Brown's acceptance speech ePolitix, 17 May 2007
 Transcript of first speech as Labour Party Leader ePolitix, 24 June 2007
 Address to the 63rd session of the United Nations General Assembly September 2008
 Manifesto speech transcript ePolitix, 12 April 2010

|-

|-

|-

|-

|-

|-

|-

|-

|-

|-

|-

|-

|-

|-

 
1951 births
21st-century prime ministers of the United Kingdom
21st-century memoirists
Academics of Glasgow Caledonian University
Academics of the Open University
Alumni of the University of Edinburgh
British politicians with disabilities
Chancellors of the Exchequer of the United Kingdom
Commission for Africa members
Honorary Fellows of the Royal Society of Edinburgh
Labour Party prime ministers of the United Kingdom
Labour Friends of Israel
Leaders of the Labour Party (UK)
Living people
Members of the Fabian Society
Members of the Parliament of the United Kingdom for Fife constituencies
Members of the Privy Council of the United Kingdom
People educated at Kirkcaldy High School
People from Kirkcaldy
People from Renfrewshire
Prime Ministers of the United Kingdom
Scottish memoirists
Scottish biographers
Rectors of the University of Edinburgh
Scottish television journalists
Scottish Labour MPs
Scottish Presbyterians
Scottish scholars and academics
Transport and General Workers' Union-sponsored MPs
UK MPs 1983–1987
UK MPs 1987–1992
UK MPs 1992–1997
UK MPs 1997–2001
UK MPs 2001–2005
UK MPs 2005–2010
UK MPs 2010–2015
Shadow Chancellors of the Exchequer
Special Envoys of the Secretary-General of the United Nations